Anne-Charlotte Mora (born 20 April 1997) is a French professional golfer who plays on the Ladies European Tour. She won the 2022 Åland 100 Ladies Open.

Amateur career
Mora started playing gold at a young age, and early on dreamed about playing professional golf. She comes from a golf family, her mother manages a golf course and her father is a PGA teaching professional and her coach. Mora was born in Orleans and grew up playing golf at nearby Marcilly. She now plays at Golf de l'Ile d'Or near Nantes, the course managed by her parents. 

At the 2015 French International Lady Juniors Amateur Championship, Mora won the stroke play portion with rounds of 70 and 72.

Mora played college golf at Texas State University 2015–2019, where she was named Sun Belt Conference Player of the Year in 2019.

Professional career
Mora turned professional in 2020 and joined the Ladies European Tour. She played in eight events her rookie season, with a best finish of 15th at the Lacoste Ladies Open de France.

In 2021, she recorded two top-10 finishes, at the Investec South African Women's Open and the VP Bank Swiss Ladies Open.

In 2022, Mora claimed her maiden Ladies European Tour victory in dramatic style, producing a strong finish to win the Åland 100 Ladies Open by one stroke, sealing her win with a birdie putt from 10 feet on the 18th hole to edge out Lisa Pettersson.

Amateur wins
2018 Grand Prix de Saint-Nom-la-Bretèche
2019 UTRGV Invitational

Source:

Professional wins (1)

Ladies European Tour wins (1)

References

External links

French female golfers
Texas State Bobcats women's golfers
Ladies European Tour golfers
Sportspeople from Nantes
1997 births
Living people